Ulmus 'Stavast' is a Dutch hybrid elm cultivar raised at the Dorschkamp Research Institute for Forestry & Landscape Planning, Wageningen, as clone '622' from the crossing of 'Commelin' with clone '202', itself a hybrid of the Exeter Elm Ulmus 'Exoniensis' and Himalayan Elm Ulmus wallichiana.

Description
The tree is distinguished by its dense root system.

Pests and diseases
'Stavast' has only a moderate resistance to Dutch elm disease, rated 3 out of 5.

Cultivation
'Stavast' has not been in commerce in its own right much. It is retained as a rootstock for grafting, as its dense root system quickly stabilized young trees. It was used as a rootstock for grafting related elms like ‘Dodoens’, ‘Clusius’ and ‘Plantijn’, cultivars now propagated by rooted cuttings.

Nevertheless, specimens were planted in the Netherlands: in the elm trial plantation at "Lepelaarweg", Zeewolde, and 1 tree in "Het Egeltjesbos" public park in village De Kwakel, Uithoorn. In 2018, at Wijdemeren city council ‘s-Gravelandsevaartweg, Loosdrecht, planted 10.  Wijdemeren holds the Netherlands Plant Collection Elm since 2020. Information given by Wijdemeren tree officer M. Tijdgat, also Elm collection holder.

A number of 'Stavast' trees were exported to New Zealand for use in trials at the Hortresearch station at Palmerston North in the 1990s.

Etymology
The name 'Stavast' is Dutch for "stand firmly", but is also used to describe someone of resolute character.

References

Hybrid elm cultivar
Ulmus articles missing images
Ulmus